This is a list of German football transfers in the winter transfer window 2016–17 by club. Only transfers of the Bundesliga, and 2. Bundesliga are included.

Bundesliga

Note: Flags indicate national team as has been defined under FIFA eligibility rules. Players may hold more than one non-FIFA nationality.

FC Bayern Munich

In:

Out:

Borussia Dortmund

In:

Out:

Bayer 04 Leverkusen

In:

Out:

Borussia Mönchengladbach

In:

Out:

FC Schalke 04

In:

Out:

1. FSV Mainz 05

In:

Out:

Hertha BSC

In:

Out:

VfL Wolfsburg

In:

Out:

1. FC Köln

In:

Out:

Hamburger SV

In:

Out:

FC Ingolstadt 04

In:

Out:

FC Augsburg

In:

Out:

Werder Bremen

In:

Out:

SV Darmstadt 98

In:

Out:

1899 Hoffenheim

In:

Out:

Eintracht Frankfurt

In:

Out:

SC Freiburg

In:

Out:

RB Leipzig

In:                                       

Out:

2. Bundesliga

VfB Stuttgart

In:

Out:

Hannover 96

In:

Out:

1. FC Nürnberg

In:

Out:

FC St. Pauli

In:

Out:

VfL Bochum

In:

Out:

1. FC Union Berlin

In:

Out:

Karlsruher SC

In:

Out:

Eintracht Braunschweig

In:

Out:

SpVgg Greuther Fürth

In:

Out:

1. FC Kaiserslautern

In:

Out:

1. FC Heidenheim

In:

Out:

Arminia Bielefeld

In:

Out:

SV Sandhausen

In:

Out:

Fortuna Düsseldorf

In:

Out:

1860 Munich

In:

Out:

Dynamo Dresden

In:

Out:

Erzgebirge Aue

In:

Out:

Würzburger Kickers

In:

Out:

See also
 2016–17 Bundesliga
 2016–17 2. Bundesliga

References

External links
 Official site of the DFB 
 Kicker.de 
 Official site of the Bundesliga 
 Official site of the Bundesliga

Football transfers winter 2016–17
Trans
2016-17